Seppo Tapani Nikkilä (born December 23, 1936 in Tampere, Finland) is a retired professional ice hockey player who played in the SM-liiga.  He played for KOOVEE. He competed in the men's tournament at the 1964 Winter Olympics. He was inducted into the Finnish Hockey Hall of Fame in 1986.

References

External links
 Finnish Hockey Hall of Fame bio

1936 births
Finnish ice hockey forwards
Living people
KOOVEE players
Ice hockey people from Tampere
Olympic ice hockey players of Finland
Ice hockey players at the 1964 Winter Olympics